Transrapid is an extended play by German electronic artist Alva Noto. It was released in 2004 via Raster Noton label.

Background
This is the first part of the transall triptych that, according to the artist, respectively deals with one of three interrelated themes: the increased speed of information flow, utopias, and the fragmentation of ideas. The record is accompanied by an essay written by journalist and author Ulf Poschardt, addressing such issues as the acceleration of art, technology and culture and concluding that a key aspect of the contemporary is the embracing of both speed and stasis.

Track listing

Personnel
Carsten Nicolai – all sounds
Nibo, R-N Modul Berlin – design 
Ulf Poschardt  – liner notes

References

External links
Alva Noto official website

2004 albums
Alva Noto albums
Raster-Noton albums